Allocnemis, formerly Chlorocnemis,  is a genus of damselflies in the family Platycnemididae.

 Allocnemis abbotti (Calvert, 1896)
 Allocnemis contraria (Schmidt, 1951)
 Allocnemis cyanura (Förster, 1909)
 Allocnemis eisentrauti (Pinhey, 1974)
 Allocnemis elongata (Hagen in Selys, 1863)
 Allocnemis flavipennis (Selys, 1863)
 Allocnemis interrupta (Legrand, 1984)
 Allocnemis leucosticta Selys, 1863
 Allocnemis maccleeryi (Pinhey, 1969)
 Allocnemis marshalli (Ris, 1921)
 Allocnemis mitwabae Pinhey, 1961
 Allocnemis montana (St. Quentin, 1942)
 Allocnemis nigripes (Selys, 1886)
 Allocnemis pauli (Longfield, 1936)
 Allocnemis subnodalis (Selys, 1886)
 Allocnemis superba (Schmidt, 1951)
 Allocnemis vicki Dijkstra & Schütte, 2015
 Allocnemis wittei (Fraser, 1955)

References

Platycnemididae
Taxa named by Edmond de Sélys Longchamps
Zygoptera genera
Taxonomy articles created by Polbot